The Pyshma is a river in Sverdlovsk and Tyumen Oblasts of Russia. It is a right tributary of the Tura.

In its lower course the river meanders heavily.

Its main tributaries are, from the right: the Kunara and the Bolshaya Kalinovka, and from the left: the Reft.

The Pyshma freezes over in early November and stays frozen until the spring thaw starts in April.

The towns along the Pyshma are Verkhnyaya Pyshma, Beryozovsky, Zarechny, Sukhoy Log, and Kamyshlov

Etymology 
The name comes from tatar language and means "calm".

References 

Rivers of Sverdlovsk Oblast
Rivers of Tyumen Oblast